Pasta frola, pasta frolla, is a type of sweet tart common to Italy, Argentina, Paraguay, Uruguay, Egypt and Greece. It is a covered, jam-filled shortcrust pastry dish principally made from flour, sugar and egg. Common fillings include quince cheese, dulce de batata (sweet potato jam), dulce de leche, guava, or strawberry jam. The covering of the tart is a thin-striped lattice which displays the filling beneath in rhomboidal or square sections. Pastafrola is most usually oven-baked in a circular shape. Most of the Greek versions of this dish are filled with sweet jam: it is considered a morning dessert.

The name of the dish comes from pasta frolla (lit. 'friable pastry'), Italian for shortcrust pastry, and is similar to the Italian crostata. Italian immigrants brought it to Argentina and Uruguay. Similar dishes include the Austrian Linzer torte and Swiss tarts with a spiced-fruit filling. In Greek, the word frolla was misinterpreted as the Italian word flora 'flower'.

The dish is served as an afternoon dessert (merienda) or with mate (a South American drink), but may be eaten at any time of the day.

Ingredients
The ingredients for the dish are:
Flour
Egg
Sugar
Butter or margarine
Jam filling (most common are quince, sweet potato jam, dulce de leche, guava, or strawberry)
Lemon zest
Vanilla extract

References

Italian pastries
Argentine desserts
Paraguayan desserts
Uruguayan desserts
Greek pastries
Guava dishes
Fruit pies
Tarts